Countess Emanuela Potocka, born Princess Emanuela Pignatelli di Cerchiara (1852–1930), was an Italian-Polish noblewoman and fashionable salonière in Paris during the 19th century.

She was a descendant of a high noble family from Italy. She married the Polish Count Potocki and established herself at the Hôtel Potocki in the 8th arrondissement of Paris. Her salon became fashionable and was visited and written about by Proust, Maupassant, Barrès, Bourget, Robert de Montesquiou, Reynaldo Hahn, Widor and others. Jean Béraud also painted her salon.

Further reading 
 Claude Leibenson. La comtesse Potocka. Une égérie de la Belle Époque. Biographie. Paris, Lacurne, 2016, 528 pages..

External links 
 http://theesotericcuriosa.blogspot.ch/2011/01/in-words-of-proust-fascinating-salon-of.html

Potocki family
French salon-holders
1852 births
1930 deaths